Ace Stream is a peer-to-peer multimedia streaming protocol, built using BitTorrent technology. Ace Stream has been recognized by sources as a potential method for broadcasting and viewing bootlegged live video streams. The protocol functions as both a client and a server. When users stream a video feed using Ace Stream, they are simultaneously downloading from peers and uploading the same video to other peers.

History 
Ace Stream began under the name TorrentStream as a pilot project to use BitTorrent technology to stream live video. In 2013 TorrentStream, was re-released under the name ACE Stream.

References 

Computer networking
Applications of distributed computing
Cloud storage
Digital television
Distributed algorithms
Distributed data storage
Distributed data storage systems
File sharing networks
Film and video technology
Internet broadcasting
Streaming television
Multimedia
Peer-to-peer computing

Streaming media systems
Video hosting
Video on demand services